Martinova or Martynova may refer to:

Geography
 Martinová, a village in Slovakia

People
 Arina Martinova, figure skater
 Iana Martynova, swimmer
 Maria Martinova, Bulgarian classical pianist
 Natalia Martinova, skier
 Olga Martynova, writer